Church of St. Paul, is an Anglican church in New Julfa, Iran. It is located in Kocher neighbourhood of New Julfa, next to St. Nerses Church.

History 

Church Missionary Society (CMS) was active in Persia from 1869, when the Revd. Robert Bruce established a mission station here in New Julfa.  It is currently one of four active Anglican churches in Iran, the others are St. Paul Church in Tehran, St. Simon the Zealot Church in Shiraz and St. Luke Church in Isfahan.

See also
Christianity in Iran
Anglican Diocese of Iran

References 

Buildings and structures in Isfahan
Churches in Isfahan
Churches in Iran
Anglicanism in Iran